Érico Lopes Verissimo (December 17, 1905 – November 28, 1975) was an important Brazilian writer, born in the State of Rio Grande do Sul.

Biography
Érico Verissimo was the son of Sebastião Verissimo da Fonseca and Abegahy Lopes Verissimo. His father, heir of a rich family in Cruz Alta, met financial ruin during his son's youth and, as a result, Erico didn't complete secondary school because of the need to work.

Verissimo settled in Cruz Alta as the owner of a drugstore, but was unsuccessful. He then moved to Porto Alegre in 1930, willing to live solely by selling his writing. There he began to live around writers of renown, such as Mário Quintana, Augusto Meyer, Guilhermino César and others. In the following year, he was hired to occupy the position of secretary of edition of the Revista do Globo, of which he would become editor in 1933. He then undertook the whole editorial project at Editora Globo, propelling its nationwide fame.

He published his first work, Fantoches ("Puppets"), in 1932, with a sequence of short stories, mostly in the form of short plays. The following year, he saw his first great success with the romance Clarissa.

Verissimo married in 1931 to Mafalda Volpe and had two children, Luis Fernando Verissimo, also a writer, and Clarissa.

In 1943  he moved with his family to the United States, where he gave lessons on Brazilian Literature in the University of California-Berkeley, until 1945. Between 1953 and 1956 he was director of the Department of Cultural Affairs of the Organization of American States, in Washington, D.C. This period of his life was recorded in some of his books, including: Gato Preto em Campo de Neve ("Black Cat in a Snow Field"), A Volta do Gato Preto ("The Return of the Black Cat"), and História da Literatura Brasileira ("History of Brazilian Literature"), which contains some of his lectures at UCLA. His epic O Tempo e o Vento ("The Time and the Wind'") became one of the great masterpieces of the Brazilian novel, alongside Os Sertões by Euclides da Cunha, and Grande Sertão: Veredas by Guimarães Rosa.

His historical trilogy O Tempo e o Vento ("The Time and the Wind") is considered as his greatest work, written in the period of 1949-1961, from which arose primordial characters such as Ana Terra and Capitão Rodrigo that went on to become popular amongst his readers. Four of his, Time and the Wind, Night, Mexico, and His Excellency, the Ambassador, were translated into the English language by Linton Lomas Barrett.

In 1965 Verissimo published the romance O Senhor Embaixador ("His Excellency, the Ambassador"), in which he reflected upon the deviations of Latin America.

In the romance Incidente em Antares ("Incident in Antares"), written in 1971, he traces a parallel with Brazilian politics with the use of fantasy, with the rebellion of corpses during a strike of the gravekeepers, in the fictitious city of Antares.

After suffering from a heart attack in 1975, Verissimo was unable to complete the second volume of his autobiography entitled Solo de Clarineta ("Clarinet Solo"), which was intended to be a trilogy, apart from a romance which would be entitled A Hora do Sétimo Anjo ("The Hour of the Seventh Angel").

He was the father of another famous writer of Rio Grande do Sul, Luis Fernando Verissimo.

Works
His works have been compiled on three occasions:
Obras de Erico Verissimo ("Works of Érico Veríssimo") – 1956 (17 volumes)
Obras completas ("Complete Works") – 1961 (10 volumes)
Ficção completa ("Complete Fiction")– 1966 (5 volumes)

Érico Verissimo's books have been translated to German, Spanish, Finnish, French, Dutch, Hungarian, Indonesian, English, Italian, Japanese, Norwegian, Romanian, Russian and Czech.

Short stories
Fantoches ("Puppets")
As mãos de meu filho ("My Son's Hands")
O ataque ("The Attack")
Os devaneios do general ("The reveries of the general")

Novels
Clarissa – 1933
Caminhos Cruzados ("Crossed Paths") – 1935
Música ao Longe ("Music From Afar") – 1936
Um Lugar ao Sol ("A Place in the Sun")– 1936
Olhai os Lírios do Campo ("Behold the Lilies of the Field")– 1938
Saga – 1940
O Resto É Silêncio| ("The Rest is Silence") – 1943
O Tempo e o Vento (The Time and the Wind"):
O continente ("The Continent") – 1949
O Retrato ("The Portrait") – 1951
O Arquipélago ("The Archipelago") – 1961Noite ("Night") - 1954 (the versions published in Portugal contain also "A Sonata" ("The Sonata"), a short story written by a solitary music teacher, that sees himself transported to the past, to the year of his birth, where he falls in love for a beautiful woman)O Senhor Embaixador ("His Majesty, the Ambassador") – 1965O Prisoneiro ("The Prisoner") – 1967Incidente em Antares ("Incident in Antares") – 1971

Children's literatureA vida de Joana d'Arc – 1935As Aventuras do Avião Vermelho – 1936Os Três Porquinhos Pobres – 1936Rosa Maria no Castelo Encantado – 1936Meu ABC – 1936As Aventuras de Tibicuera – 1937O Urso com Música na Barriga – 1938A Vida do Elefante Basílio – 1939Outra vez os três porquinhos – 1939Viagem à aurora do mundo – 1939Aventuras no mundo da higiene – 1939Gente e bichos – 1956

Travel literatureGato Preto em Campo de Neve – 1941A Volta do Gato Preto – 1946México – 1957Israel em Abril – 1969

AutobiographiesO escritor diante do espelho – 1966 (in "Ficção Completa")Solo de Clarineta – Memórias (Volume I) – 1973Solo de clarineta – Memórias (Volume II) – 1976 (posthumous edition, organized by Flávio L. Chaves)

EssaysBrazilian Literature: an Outline – 1945Mundo velho sem porteira – 1973Breve história da literatura brasileiraBiographiesUm certo Henrique Bertaso – 1972

Translations
NovelsThe Ringer, by Edgar Wallace – 1931The Crimson Circle, by Edgar Wallace – 1931The Door with Seven Locks, by Edgar Wallace – 1931Jahrgang 1902, by Ernst Glaeser – 1933Point Counter Point, by Aldous Huxley – 1934Kleiner Mann, Was nun?, by Hans Fallada – 1937We Are Not Alone, by James Hilton – 1940Goodbye Mr. Chips, by James Hilton – 1940Of Mice and Men, by John Steinbeck – 1940Portrait of Jennie, by Robert Nathan – 1942They Shoot Horses, Don't They?, by Horace McCoy – 1947Then and Now, by Somerset Maugham – 1948The Clue of the New Pin), by Edgar Wallace – 1956

Short StoriesPsychology, by Katherine Mansfield – 1939 (Revista do Globo)Bliss, by Katherine Mansfield – 1940Her First Ball'', by Katherine Mansfield – 1940 (Revista do Globo)

References

External links
The Rise of Modern Literature in Southern Brazil

1905 births
1975 deaths
People from Rio Grande do Sul
Culture in Rio Grande do Sul
Brazilian people of Italian descent
Brazilian people of Portuguese descent
Brazilian agnostics
Brazilian male novelists
Brazilian male short story writers
Brazilian translators
Brazilian essayists
English–Portuguese translators
20th-century translators
20th-century Brazilian novelists
20th-century Brazilian short story writers
20th-century essayists
20th-century Brazilian male writers